Carl Antonio Granger (born June 6, 1976) is an American former professional basketball player. At 2.01 m (6 ft 7 in) tall, he played at the shooting guard and small forward positions.

College career
After playing high school basketball at Denby High School in his hometown of Detroit, Michigan, Granger played college basketball at Boston College, with the Boston College Eagles. He was inducted into the Boston College Varsity Club Athletic Hall of Fame in 2012.

Professional career
In his professional playing career, Granger played with: Olimpia Basket Pistoia, Rimini Basket, Biella, Sevilla, Virtus Bologna, Efes, and CSKA Moscow.

References

External links
Euroleague.net Profile
FIBA Europe Profile
Eurobasket.com Profile
Draftexpress.com Profile
TBLStat.net Profile
Italian League Profile 
Spanish League Profile 

1976 births
Living people
American expatriate basketball people in Italy
American expatriate basketball people in Russia
American expatriate basketball people in Spain
American expatriate basketball people in Turkey
American men's basketball players
Anadolu Efes S.K. players
Basketball players from Detroit
Basket Rimini Crabs players
Boston College Eagles men's basketball players
Real Betis Baloncesto players
Liga ACB players
Pallacanestro Biella players
PBC CSKA Moscow players
Shooting guards
Small forwards
Denby High School alumni
Virtus Bologna players